Tarzetta cupularis is a species of apothecial fungus belonging to the family Pyronemataceae. This is a species of northern Europe with occasional records from further south in Spain and Morocco. It also occurs in North America. It appears from spring to autumn as brown to cream-coloured flask-shaped cups up to 2 cm across and 2.5 cm tall in groups in damp woodland. The related Tarzetta catinus tends to be larger with a more open cup, but the two species can only be reliably distinguished microscopically: by the shape of the spores (those of T. cupularis being narrower) and the paraphyses (those of T. cupularis lacking the distinctive lobed tips of T. catinus). T. cupularis is inedible.

References

External links

Tarzetta cupularis at GBIF

Pyronemataceae
Fungi described in 1753
Fungi of Europe
Fungi of North America
Inedible fungi
Taxa named by Carl Linnaeus